The Massachusetts Senate is the upper house of the Massachusetts General Court, the bicameral state legislature of the Commonwealth of Massachusetts. The Senate comprises 40 elected members from 40 single-member senatorial districts in the state. Descended from the colonial legislature, the current Massachusetts Senate was established in June 1780 upon the adoption of the Massachusetts Constitution. The first General Court met in October 1780 and consisted of one-year elected terms for both houses. This was expanded to two-year terms starting with the 142nd General Court in January 1921. The current delegation is the 191st General Court (2019–2020), consisting of 34 Democrats (D) and 6 Republicans (R).

171st to 175th General Courts (1979–1988)
In  1977 the Massachusetts Senate districts were redrawn, taking effect with the 171st General Court.

176th to 178th General Courts (1989–1994)
In  1987 the Massachusetts Senate districts were redrawn, taking effect with the 176th General Court.

179th to 182nd General Courts (1994–2002)
In  1993 the Massachusetts Senate districts were redrawn, taking effect with the 179th General Court.

183rd to 187th General Courts (2003–2012)
In 2001 the Massachusetts Senate districts were redrawn, taking effect with the 183rd General Court.

188th to 192nd General Courts (2013–2023)
In 2011 the Massachusetts Senate districts were redrawn, taking effect with the 188th General Court.

See also
 List of former districts of the Massachusetts Senate
 List of Massachusetts General Courts

Footnotes

References

Sources
  Mass.gov:  Legislature website
  Sec.state.ma: Election results
 Mass.gov:  Burrill Collection

.01
Senate
Massa